Adi Irani   is an Indian actor who has worked in Bollywood films. He also did the role of V. P. Menon in 2013 TV show Pradhanmantri. He is brother of director-producer Indra Kumar and Bollywood actress Aruna Irani. He has also acted in TV serials like Yahaaan Main Ghar Ghar Kheli, Ssshhhh...Phir Koi Hai.

Personal life 
Adi Irani's wife name is Dawn Irani and the couple has two daughters named Anaida Irani and Araaya Irani.

Filmography

Films
 1978 – Trishna
 1986 – Baat Ban Jaye
 1988 - Kasam
 1988 =  Zulm Ko Jala Doonga
 1989 – Nafrat Ki Aandhi
 1990 – Dil
 1991 – Swarg Yahan Narak Yahan
 1992 – Beta
 1992 – Parda Hai Parda
 1993 – Baazigar
 1993 – Anari
 1993 – Zakhmo Ka Hisaab
 1993 - Santaan
 1994 - Khuddar
 1995 - Raja
 1995 - Nishana
 1998 – Pyaar to hona hi tha
 1999 – Anari No. 1 
 1999 – Baadshah
 1999 – Hum apke dil mein rehte hai
2000 - Tumse Acha Koun Hain
 2001 – Chori Chori Chupke Chupke
 2006 – Pyare Mohan
 2007 – Welcome
 2009 - Team: The Force
 2013 – Wake Up India
 2013 – Raqt as co-director with Shiva Rindan
 2015 – Welcome Back
 2016 – Ek Kahani Julie Ki
 2022 – A Thursday

Television

 Kasautii Zindagii Kay as Siddhanth Chaubey
 Yahaaan Main Ghar Ghar Kheli
 Pradhanmantri as V. P. Menon
 Ssshhhh...Phir Koi Hai - Episode 88-89: Balighat Ka Bargad as Bankim Daa (2008) Star One
 'Ssshhhh...Phir Koi Hai - Episode 108-109: Kumbharakha as Purohit (2008) Star One
 Savitri - EK Prem Kahani Rang Badalti Odhani Rakt Sambandh Des Mein Niklla Hoga Chand as John
 Love Ne Mila Di Jodi as Balraj Saxena
 Hare Kkaanch Ki Choodiyaan Tum Bin Jaaoon Kahaan as Harshvardhan (Harsh) Rajsingh
 Zameen Se Aassman Tak Kahin Diyaa Jale Kahin Jiyaa Naaginn Aashiyana  Urmila Saath Rahega Always  Apne Paraye C.I.D. Savdhaan India -  Kishorilal (Episode No 231) / Ranvijay (Episode No 1293) / Sagar  (Episode No 1629)
  Jai Ganesha as Kalanemi (Tarakasur's friend)''
 Akoori (web series) in 2018 on ZEE5 Originals
Lockdown Ki Love Story as Shobhakant Jaiswal (2020-2021)
Durga – Mata Ki Chhaya as Advocate Batra (2020–2021)
Jag Jaanani Maa Vaishnodevi- KMK as Devendra
Sasural Simar Ka 2 as Gopichand Oswal (2021) on Colors

References

External links
 
 

Indian male television actors
Indian male film actors
Male actors in Hindi cinema
Irani people
Year of birth missing (living people)
Living people